Just Between Friends  is a 1986 American drama film.

Just Between Friends may also refer to:
 Just Between Friends (album), a 2008 album by saxophonist Houston Person and bassist Ron Carter
 Just Between Friends (soundtrack), the original soundtrack to the 1986 film

See also
 Between Friends (disambiguation)
 "Joust Between Friends", an episode of the American television show The Golden Girls